The Hackerbrücke (Hacker Bridge) is a road bridge across the main railway line in Munich immediately west of the town's central station.

The first bridge was built at the beginning of the 1870s.  In 1890-94 this was replaced by a new bridge, constructed by the Maschinenfabrik Augsburg-Nürnberg ("Augsburg-Nuremberg machine factory").  It was partially destroyed during the second world war and restored in 1952–3.  Six iron arches, 28.8 metres wide and eight metres high, carry the road; pairs of stone pillars support the arches.  The bridge gives its name to the S-Bahn station Hackerbrücke, which is beneath the bridge and can only be accessed from it.

References
J. H. Biller and H.-P. Rasp, München, Kunst & Kultur, Munich: Südwest, ed. 18, 2006, p. 155. 

Buildings and structures in Munich
Maxvorstadt
Road bridges in Germany